Melilla Club Deportivo is a Spanish football team based in Melilla. Founded in 2014, it plays in Primera Autonómica de Melilla, holding home games at Estadio La Espiguera, which has a capacity of 2,000 spectators.

Season to season

2 seasons in Tercera División

References

External links
BDFutbol team profile
Soccerway team profile

Football clubs in Melilla
Association football clubs established in 2014
2014 establishments in Spain